Paix Bouche is a village in northern Dominica. It has a population of 306, and has one of the island's steepest roads. The name comes from the local Creole expression meaning "shut your mouth".

References

Populated places in Dominica
Saint Andrew Parish, Dominica